The Dragon Light Pagoda (Chinese: t , s , Longguang Ta) may refer to:

 Dragon Light Pagoda (Wuxi)
 Dragon Light Pagoda (Singapore)